Georges Bayrou (21 December 1883 – 5 December 1953) was a French footballer. He competed in the men's tournament at the 1908 Summer Olympics.

Career
Bayrou played for Gallia Club Paris in 1904–1908, where he won the 1905 USFSA Football Championship. On 22 October 1908, he played his first and only match for France in a 17–1 defeat against Denmark during the 1908 Summer Olympics.

In 1908, he became the president of Olympique de Cette, which later became FC Sète, in which they won two Coupe de France in 1930 and 1934, and two Division 1 titles in 1933–34 and 1938–39, during his tenure. However, the Stade Georges-Bayrou was named after him.

References

External links
 

1883 births
1953 deaths
French footballers
France international footballers
Olympic footballers of France
Footballers at the 1908 Summer Olympics
People from Sète
Association football forwards
Sportspeople from Hérault
Footballers from Occitania (administrative region)